The 7th annual Australian Nickelodeon Kids' Choice Awards was held on 13 November 2009 at the Hisense Arena in Melbourne and was broadcast as LIVE in Australia at 7.00pm on Nickelodeon (Foxtel and Austar). The nominees for 2009 were announced on 20 September 2009.

There were performances by Australian artists, Guy Sebastian, Jessica Mauboy, Cassie Davis and Short Stack. The hosts of the night were, Australian singer Delta Goodrem, along with international co-hosts, Benji Madden and Joel Madden from Good Charlotte. Miranda Cosgrove from hit Nickelodeon show iCarly was a special guest. An Australian magazine reported that Twilight stars Robert Pattinson and Kristen Stewart would also be attending, but this rumour has now been debunked due to the timing of the New Moon release in the U.S.

Guests
Slipknot 
Good Charlotte
Miranda Cosgrove
Joel Madden
Benji Madden
Delta Goodrem
Guy Sebastian
Jessica Mauboy
Indiana Evans
Cassie Davis
Adam Copeland
Eve Torres
Faria Putal
Short Stack
Bindi Irwin
Robert Irwin
Vanessa Amorosi
Josh Thomas
Sam Clark
Kyle Linahan
Rachael Finch
Cassie Davis
Angus McLaren
Margot Robbie
Peter Helliar
Ed Kavalee
Nat Wolff
Alex Wolff
Cariba Heine
Ruby Rose
Shaun Micallef
Dean Geyer
Andrew G
James Sorensen
Poh Ling Yeow
Julie Goodwin
Luke and Wyatt
Dash and Will
Nacho Pop

Performers
Guy Sebastian
Jessica Mauboy
Cassie Davis
Delta Goodrem
Benji Madden and Joel Madden

Nominees

Music

Fave Aussie Singer
 Jessica Mauboy
 Cassie Davis
 Natalie Bassingthwaighte
 Wes Carr

Fave Aussie Band
 Short Stack
 The Veronicas
 AC/DC
 Kisschasy

Fave Song
 I Gotta Feeling – Black Eyed Peas
 Love Story – Taylor Swift
 Paranoid – The Jonas Brothers
 Sway, Sway Baby! – Short Stack

Fave International Band
 Black Eyed Peas
 Fall Out Boy
 The Jonas Brothers
 The Naked Brothers Band

Fave International Singer
 Pink
 Demi Lovato
 Miley Cyrus
 Taylor Swift

Movies

Fave Movie
 17 Again
 Bolt
 Ice Age 3
 Twilight

Fave Movie Star
 Daniel Radcliffe
 Robert Pattinson
 Joe Jonas
 Zac Efron

TV

Fave Comedy Show
 Drake and Josh
 iCarly
 Sonny With a Chance
 Talkin' 'Bout Your Generation

Fave Drama Show
 Blue Water High
 Neighbours
 H2O: Just Add Water
 Home and Away

Fave International TV Star
 Drake Bell
 Miley Cyrus
 Miranda Cosgrove
 Selena Gomez

Fave Reality TV Show
 Australian Idol
 Camp Orange
  Master Chef Australia 
 So You Think You Can Dance Australia

Fave TV Star
 Andrew G
 Natalie Bassingthwaighte
 Rove McManus
 Shaun Micallef

Fave Toon
 SpongeBob SquarePants
 Phineas and Ferb
 Avatar: The Last Airbender
 The Simpsons

Hotties

Fave Sports Stars
 David Beckham
 Libby Trickett
 Michael Clarke
 Stephanie Rice

Fave Aussie
 Bindi Irwin
 Hugh Jackman
 Rove McManus
 Jessica Mauboy

Fave Aussie Hottie
 Dean Geyer
 Margot Robbie
 Miranda Kerr
 Shaun Diviney

So Hot Right Now
 Miranda Cosgrove
 Jessica Mauboy
 Guy Sebastian

Biggest Greenie
 Bindi & Robert Irwin

References

External links
 KCA 2009 website

Nickelodeon Kids' Choice Awards
2009 awards
2009 in Australian television
2000s in Melbourne